Pat Wilson (born Patricia Mary Higgins; 11 June 1948) is an Australian singer and journalist. Wilson wrote for Go-Set, a 1960s and 1970s pop music newspaper, under the pen-name "Mummy Cool" during 1971–1972. Wilson released several singles in the early 1980s including the hit single "Bop Girl". The song was written by her then husband Ross Wilson of the bands Daddy Cool and Mondo Rock. Pat currently resides in the Melbourne suburb of Elwood.

Biography

Early years
Little is known about Wilson's early years.

She first saw Ross Wilson perform with his band The Pink Finks in about 1965, when she was sixteen. They met when he was working for the Department of Supply. In 1969, Ross left Australia for England to become a member of Procession. Wilson joined him there; they married and returned to Australia.

Ross and three bandmates formed Daddy Cool in 1970 and toured Australia. In early 1971 they performed at the Myponga Festival in South Australia. Concert footage of their performance of "Eagle Rock" shows a pregnant Wilson in the front row (from 1m.43sec, right hand side of the screen). Both Pat (visibly pregnant) and Ross also appear in Chris Löfvén's short film Part Two - The Beginning. The Wilsons' son Daniel was born just as "Eagle Rock" reached No. 1 on the National singles charts. At about this time, Wilson started writing her column for Go-Set taking over an advice column called "Dear Lesley Pixie" and using the pen-name "Mummy Cool". She also appeared in a documentary about the band, singing with Rock Granite and the Profiles, a group which featured future members of Jo Jo Zep and the Falcons.

In 1975 Wilson appeared on Australian band Skyhooks' second album Ego is not a Dirty Word playing finger cymbals on the title track, "Ego is not a Dirty Word". Ross produced the album.

"Bop Girl"

In September 1983, Wilson released "Bop Girl", a song written by Ross which peaked at number 2 in Australia; and achieved airplay in the United States, where it peaked at No. 104 on the Billboard pop chart. Ross also provided backing vocals and appeared in its music video.

Eric McCusker of Mondo Rock, when interviewed in Juke Magazine in 1983, was asked whether he could have written something like "Bop Girl", he replied:

"No, that's a very Ross Wilson song isn't it?  That's been around for about four years.  I think Ross did a demo with some guys from the first Mondo line up and we all liked the song but it was obvious it wasn't a Mondo Rock sound.  But that's what I say about doing other things aside from Mondo Rock: it's healthy and you don't feel restricted as a result."

A single "Strong Love" was released in May 1984 and peaked at number 26. This was following by the 5-track mini-album Strong Love.  This mini-album was issued in the US as Bop Girl.

Personal life
Wilson was married to musician Ross Wilson for 20 years according to her account on ABC-TV's Talking Heads on 9 July 2007, where Peter Thompson interviewed Ross. They have a son, Daniel, born in 1971.

Discography

Albums
 Strong Love (1984 Warner Music Group)

Singles
 "Bop Girl" / "Tacky" (1983) AUS No. 2
 "Strong Love" (1984) AUS No. 26

Awards and nominations

Countdown Music Awards
Countdown was an Australian pop music TV series on national broadcaster ABC-TV from 1974–1987 and it presented music awards from 1979–1987, known as the Countdown Music Awards.

|-
| rowspan="3"| 1983
| rowspan="2"| "Bop Girl"
| Best Debut Single
| 
|-
| Best Promotional Video
| 
|-
| herself
| Most Popular Female Artist
| 
|-

References

1948 births
Australian women singers
Australian journalists
Place of birth missing (living people)
Living people